Bojonegoro Regency  (older spelling is Kabupaten Bodjanegara) is a regency in East Java, Indonesia, about 110 km west of Surabaya. It is located in the inland part of northern Java plain, on the banks of the Solo River, the longest river in Java. It had a population of 1,209,973 at the 2010 Census and 1,301,635 at the 2020 Census, comprising 653,686 males and 647,949 females. The administrative centre of the regency is the town of Bojonegoro District.

Previously known as a major producer of teak and tobacco, Bojonegoro is a focus of attention in Indonesia as a new oil field has been found in this area. This oil find is the biggest oil discovery in Indonesia in three decades and one of the biggest reserve in Indonesia.

Geography
Across the eastern border of Bojonegoro is the Lamongan Regency, to the north is Tuban while to the south is Ngawi, Madiun, Nganjuk and Jombang.  Blora is located to the west, in Central Java.

Bojonegoro occupies an area of 2,307.06 km2. Much of it consists of low plains along the Solo River, with hilly areas in southern part of the Regency. As with most of Java, the Bojonegoro landscape is dominated with rice paddy fields. In the Bojonegoro area, the Solo River changes its course from northward to eastward.

Climate in Bojonegoro is tropical with six months of rainy and dry seasons.  Seasonal conditions are often very contrasting. In the rainy season, rain will fall almost daily while in the dry season, rain will not come for months, causing widespread drought and water shortages. These problems have been compounded with the loss of forest and other green areas. Teak forest once covered much of Bojonegoro, but has since considerably reduced due to over exploitation.

Floods in the rainy season of 2007 were bigger than in previous years. The water level of Solo River rose due to heavy rain, especially in the upper valley in Central Java, forcing the Gajah Mungkur Dam to be opened. The resulting flood submerged 15 districts, with water as high as 1.5 m, and displaced 2,700 families. A further 2.5 hectares of rice fields were damaged. No casualties were reported.

Climate 
Bojonegoro has 42-100% of humidity. Maximum humidity is 100% and average humidity is 81%. Bojonegoro has 0–35 km/hr of wind velocity. Maximum wind velocity is at 35 km/h (18.9 knot). Average wind velocity is 30 km/hr (16.2 knot). It has average temperature of 27.1 °C - 28.2 °C.

History
The area near the Solo River is fertile and has been settled since early history by the Javanese. However, these settlements never developed into a major urban center, except for several coastal cities. Rather, villages are dependent on a weekly market which rotates among them and bakul (traveling peddlers) who collect and distribute agricultural and manufactured products among the villages.

The Solo River played a major role in the development of these settlements. It acted as source of water and fertile soil, and a means of transportation. A set of copper plates of the Ferry Charter (1358 C.E.) lists over twenty ferry crossing on the lower stretch of the Solo River, downstream from Bojonegoro. Inland settlements would trade agricultural products via trading centres in the coastal cities, like neighbouring Tuban, for spices from Spice Islands, ceramics from China and other commodities.

The authority over these settlements, including the territory of modern-day Bojonegoro, was held by the dominant power in Central Java, and later East Java, the kingdoms of Mataram, Kediri, Singhasari and Majapahit.

As a territory in northern Java, the area of modern-day Bojonegoro was one of the first to accept Islam. The Solo River area and most of Java would become part of the Sultanate of Demak and its successor the Sultanate of Mataram.

The modern regency (kabupaten) was founded on October 20, 1677, with Mas Toemapel as the first regent (bupati), with capital in Jipang village (currently around Padangan district in the westernmost part of Bojonegoro). It was founded as a response to the loss of Mataram's coastal area to the Dutch East India Company. Bojonegoro than became important border town. In 1725 the capital was moved to its current location.

After the Dutch took over Java in the 18th and 19th centuries, Bojonegoro and the neighbouring regencies of Tuban and Lamongan were administered under Bojonegoro Residency, with a Dutch Resident in Bojonegoro town. The resident acted as an advisor and supervisor to the regents, positions which were held by native Javanese nobility (priyayi).

During Dutch rule, tobacco and maize was introduced from the Americas, which would later become major commodities in Bojonegoro.

In 1894, the trans-Java railroad, which linked Batavia and Surabaya and passed through Bojonegoro, was finished, increasing transportation and improving the teak industry. Urbanisation also progressed under Dutch rule.

Since the Indonesian National Revolution, Bojonegoro regency has been administered as part of East Java province, with R.M.T. Suryo, the grandson of the former Bojonegoro regent as its first governor. In 2008, Bojonegoro people elected its first directly elected regent, following an amendment in the constitution. Suyoto of National Mandate Party was elected as regent. In 2018 Election, DR Hj. Anna Muawannah (PKB-National Awakening Party) won the election by majority (30.7%) and elected as regent.

Administrative districts
At the 2010 Census, Bojonegoro Regency was divided into twenty-seven districts (kecamatan), but in 2012 an additional district - Gayam District - was created from parts of the existing Ngasem and Kalitidu Districts.  These are tabulated below with their areas and population totals from the 2010 Census and the 2020 Census. The table also includes the number of administrative villages (rural desa and urban kelurahan) in each district, and its postal codes.

Notes: (a) except the village of Margomulyo, which has a post code of 62168. (b) except the village of Sumberejo, which has a post code of 62191. (c) the population of Gayam District in 2010 is included in the figures for Ngasem and Kalitidu Districts, from parts of which it was created in 2012.

Demographics

Bojonegoro regency has a population of 1,450,889 people. Most of the population work as farmers or foresters. Many still live in poverty, especially in the southern part of the regency, where the soil is less fertile. The major population centre is Bojonegoro town, located on the southern bank of Bengawan Solo river.

Ethnic groups
The racial makeup of this regency is mainly Javanese, with a minority of Chinese, Madurese, Balinese, Batak people, and other Indonesian ethnic groups.

Language
Most local residents speak Javanese as daily language and Indonesian on formal and writing activities, though a minority speak Madurese and other languages.

Religion
Most Javanese and Madurese are Muslim, with small number belonging to Christian sects. Chinese follow various religions, often with an aspect of syncretism with traditional Chinese culture.

Economy

Agriculture 

Agriculture has been the regency's main industry. The Solo River provides fertile farming area for rice. The main crops are rice and tobacco, as well as maize. In 1984, the area of maize harvested reached 67,000 hectares with yields ranging from 1 to 1.28 t/ha. A typical farmer grows rice in the rainy season, when water is abundant, and tobacco or maize in dry season. There is a high risk in agriculture because of seasonal uncertainty. Rice growing will fail if the rainy season ends before its time, and tobacco growing will fail if rain comes early.

Bojonegoro is one of the biggest producers of tobacco in Indonesia, with a total value of Rp1.2 trillion (around US$100 million) and employing 57 percent of workforce. The majority of tobacco planted is Virginia varieties. However, Bojonegoro tobacco suffers from a high proportion of chlorine, and uncertain rainfall. Most tobacco is used to make clove cigarettes (kretek).

Forestry 

Bojonegoro is also known for its hardwood tree (teak) production. There is an annual Bojonegoro Teak Fair in late January to early February where local craftsmen display their products. Teak is mainly used in shipbuilding and furniture making. A teak cutter is called  in the local Javanese dialect.

Teak forestry faces a major problem in illegal logging, as with other parts of Indonesia. In 2001 alone, the area looted covered 3,000 ha; looters stole an estimated 27,000 trees. The regional police reported impounding 550 large trucks of stolen timber, approximately 2,000 m3, with an estimated local market value of US$1,000,000. Several riots have happened when tension arise from teak claims and when police tried to enforce the law on local thieves.

These riots were the worst during the period of turmoil between president Abdurrahman Wahid and Megawati Sukarnoputri in 2001. However, after that situation calmed, enforcement became better, but illegal logging is still a significant problem, with police and bureaucratic officials often accused of cooperating with timber thieves.

Petroleum and gas 

The recent discovery of oil and gas fields in the area is providing new economic opportunities.

The oil/gas fields locations include Banyu Urip, Alas Dara, Alas Tua West, Alas Tua East, Jambaran, Cendana (ExxonMobil 45%, Pertamina 45%, local companies 10% - under Joint Operating Agreement) and Sukowati (Operated under Joint Operating Body - Petrochina Pertamina East Java).

The main exploration started officially when a cooperative contract signed on September 17, 2005, with Mobil Cepu Ltd., a subsidiary of ExxonMobil as main operator. A joint operation agreement between state oil company Pertamina was signed in March 2006. Pertamina and ExxonMobil concluded a 30-year production-sharing contract in which each company would share 45 percent interest in the block. The remaining 10 percent would go to the local governments. Foreign companies, mainly from China, have started to invest in Bojonegoro in various projects related with the planned exploration and exploitation of the Cepu Block oil fields with total value of US$8 million. According to the former minister and ambassador to the United States, Dorodjatun Kuntjoro-Jakti, Tuban and Bojonegoro would resemble Texas, because of its gas and oil resources.

Communities in Bojonegoro has benefited from community development projects by foreign companies like ExxonMobil, which have built houses of worship, schools, community health centers, and infrastructure. However, oil production is becoming a source of controversy.

A number of Regional Representatives Council (Dewan Perwakilan Rakyat, DPD) members grouped in the People's Front for the Salvation of the Cepu Block (GRPBC) have called for the cancellation of the joint operation agreement between the government and ExxonMobil on the Cepu Block oil fields. They demand it to be cancelled because the agreement had been signed "in an atmosphere rife with suspected corruption, collusion and nepotism, and on the basis of a public lie" and will make the Indonesian government lose US$1.32 billion of revenue. And Now, New Bojonegoro Leader (Bupati Bojonegoro) are waiting for new re-agreement with ExxonMobil to avoid corruption, collusion and nepotism.

Oil exploration and production activity has also caused several accidents. On August 31, 2006, a gas leak in Sukowati-5 oil well (Operated by JOB Pertamina Petrochina East Java) released hydrogen sulfide gas to residential areas. At least 16 villagers had to be treated for suffocation because of the gas inhalation.

The environmental effects of the oil industry have become a concern of Bojonegoro residents. Some villagers claimed the presence of the oil well has not caused any improvement of the local economy and the village. Since the exploration of the Sukowati oil well in an area measuring five hectares in July 2005, the village's land has become drier and harvest significantly reduced. There is also concern that income distribution inequality could cause social unrest, when compounded with the Indonesian notorious reputation of corruption.

Infrastructure

Transport

Roads and intercity bus services
Indonesian National Route 20 traverses Bojonegoro from Babat, goes south to Ngawi and joins Indonesian National Route 15 which goes east from Yogyakarta to Surabaya in Caruban. The road also meets Indonesian National Route 1 at a junction in Babat.

Bojonegoro regency is served by extensive intercity bus services (stopping and express) offering routes to neighbouring regencies, Surabaya, Malang, Denpasar, Bandung and Greater Jakarta, usually starting and terminating at Rajekwesi bus station in the eastern part of Bojonegoro district.

Railways

Bojonegoro is well served by trains operated by PT Kereta Api Indonesia. The train service began after the completion of the trans-Java railroad which connecting Batavia (Jakarta) and Surabaya in 1894. A double tracking project connecting Semarang and Surabaya via Bojonegoro finished on 3 September 2014. 
Bojonegoro regency has 6 railway stations spread across the regency: Bojonegoro, Kapas, Sumberejo, Bowerno, Kalitidu, and Tobo

Culture

Snack
Ledre is a snack from Bojonegoro. It is rolled and made from banana, especially from the local banana cultivar called pisang raja.

Local media
Bojonegoro has two local television network B-One TV and JTV Bojonegoro. Radar Bojonegoro (Jawa Pos Group) is published daily as a bundle of Jawa Pos newspaper. A monthly tabloid, Blok Bojonegoro, is also based in the regency.

Sport
Football (soccer) and badminton are the most popular sports in Bojonegoro.  The regency football team, Persibo Bojonegoro, is currently playing in Indonesian Premier League, the highest level of professional competition for football clubs in Indonesia since 2011. Their home stadium is Lt Gen Sudirman Stadium, Bojonegoro.

Badminton was either introduced by Dutch colonists or, more likely, by ethnic Chinese. Ethnic Chinese in Sumatra introduced badminton from Malaya by inviting Chinese players in the early 1930s. In the mid-1930s, a player from Batavia, Oei Kok Tjoan, visited cities in East Java on a number of occasions, raising the popularity of badminton. The game began to penetrate the small towns such as Tuban, Bojonegoro, Malang, and Jember, and became one of the most popular sports in Java.

In archery, athletes from Bojonegoro have dominated many national and international archery championships. Rina Dewi Puspitasari and I Gusti Nyoman Puruhito Praditya have competed in national and international archery competitions, including the 2004 Summer Olympics. As of October 2006, Rina Dewi Puspitasari is ranked 39th in the Recurve Women category with 59.95 points. Praditya is ranked 52 in the Compound Man category with 41.2 points.

Samin people

One of the distinctive communities in Bojonegoro is the Samin people. They were ethnically indistinguishable from other Javanese people. Samin people are follower of Surosentiko Samin, a local farmer who preached pacifist resistance to Dutch colonial rule in the 1890s. Samin was incited by acquisition of local teak forest by Dutch colonial authority. Dutch officials refused access to the forest for local people, as it was claimed as Dutch property. Rather than rising in a violent uprising, Samin taught peaceful resistance, such as refusing to pay taxes to the colonial authority, and continuing to take teak from the forest as they had for generations.
Samin people are nominally Muslim, but do not practice many Islamic rituals, such as fasting or regular prayer. Rather, they emphasize the spiritual aspect, as well as honesty, modesty and simplicity. In this, they are similar to Kejawen followers.
Samin people reside in the southwestern part of Bojonegoro (in the heart of its teak forest) and in Blora Regency, Central Java.

Notable persons
 Abdoel Gaffar Pringgodigdo, Minister of Justice (21 January–6 September 1950) and Minister of State Secretariat (19 August–14 November 1945)
 Aries Tuansyah, footballer
 Basofi Sudirman, Governor of East Java (1993–1998)
 Budiono Darsono, journalist and founder of DetikCom
 Bijahil Chalwa, footballer
 Hanis Sagara Putra, footballer
 I Gusti Nyoman Puruhito Praditya, archer
 Novan Sasongko, footballer
 Pratikno, Indonesian minister of state secretariat (incumbent)
 Rina Dewi Puspitasari, archer
 Samsul Arif, footballer
 Sumarsan, traditional Javanese musician
 Titie Said, writer, journalist and chair of the Indonesian Film Censorship Board from 2003 to 2006 and from 2006 to 2009.

References

External links

 Official site
 Bupati Bojonegoro official site
 Bojonegoro public forums
 Badan Pusat Statistik Kabupaten Bojonegoro

 
1677 establishments in Asia
Solo River